The Muckleburgh Collection is a military museum sited on a former military camp at Weybourne, on the North Norfolk coast, England. It was opened to the public in 1988 and is the largest privately owned military museum in the United Kingdom.

History

The museum is located on the site of the Second World War and post-war Weybourne Anti Aircraft Training Camp. Weybourne Camp is north west of the coastal village of Weybourne. The site, originally called Carvel Farm,  was first used in 1935 by the Anti–Aircraft Division of the Territorial Army as a summer training camp. In 1937 and as a result of the growing threat of war, it was decided to make the camp permanent and more fixed structures and defences were erected.

During the Second World War, the camp was surrounded by a perimeter anti-tank ditch and defended by a system of gun emplacements and barbed wire. The interior of the camp consisted of groups of Nissen huts, barracks and other military buildings. The cliff top to the north was covered by a line of heavy anti-aircraft guns and batteries, slit trenches and pillboxes. In 1941, the camp was visited by Winston Churchill, to view a demonstration of the Unrotated Projectile anti–aircraft weapon.

As the war progressed, defences at Weybourne Camp became more complex and were altered regularly and significantly and a grass airstrip was laid out, which remains in use.

After the war, the camp became known as the AA permanent Range and Radar Training Wing and gunnery training continued until 1958. The site still has a RAF radar receiving station and is the location of the University of East Anglia Weybourne Atmospheric Observatory and a Metrological Station.

The museum
When Weybourne Camp closed, the site returned to private ownership and many buildings that were beyond repair were demolished.

The Muckleburgh Collection was founded by Squadron Leader Berry Savory and his son Michael Savory. At the time of the museum's opening in 1988, the principal display consisted of 30 vehicles and a small room describing the camp history. The museum has expanded to include over 150 artillery pieces, tanks and other vehicles, most of which are in working order.

The Muckleburgh Collection is home to the Suffolk and Norfolk Yeomanry collection, the North Norfolk Amateur Radio Group and numerous special displays. The vehicles, museum site, and its unspoilt  has been used for television films, documentaries and dramas.

The museum offers rides in a military vehicle and hosts "tank driving" in a FV432. Among the 25 working tanks are a Panzer P-68, a Chieftain and a Stuart M5A1, a Soviet T-55 and a Canadian-built Sherman.

Exhibits

Tracked

A41 Centurion Mk5
AMX-13
Centurion ARRV
Churchill Mk7 
Comet Mk 2 
FV101 Scorpion CVR(T)
FV4201 Chieftain Mk5
FV433 Abbot SPG (two)
FV432 APC
FV434 ARV 
FV438 Swingfire
M24 Chaffee
M47 Patton
M16A2 White with Maxson quad 50 calibre MG
M29 Weasel Cargo Carrier 
M4A1 Sherman 'Grizzly'
M5A1 Stuart (Honey)
MT-55 Bridgelayer
Panzer PZ61
Panzer PZ68
Sexton 25Pdr SP
T-34/85 MBT
T-55 MBT
Tracked Rapier SAM Launcher M74B
Universal Carrier No2 Mk1
ZSU-23-4 Shilka Anti-aircraft

Armoured

BTR-40 APC
Daimler Armoured Car Mk1
Daimler Dingo Mk2 Scout Car
Ferret Mk1/2 (two)
FV1611 Humber Mk2 ('Pig')
FV601 Alvis Saladin Mk2
FV620 Alvis Stalwart Mk1 (two)
Landsverk Unimog Scout Car
M3A1 White Scout Car
M8 Greyhound
Alvis Saracen APC Mk1

Guns

105 mm Field Gun
105 mm L3A1 Pack Howitzer
12 Pdr Naval Gun Mk5
L1 BAT
QF 13 pounder Field Gun
Argentine CITEFA 155 mm Field Gun M-77
155 mm gun M1 Long Tom
QF 17-pounder anti-tank gun
QF 18 Pounder field gun
QF 2-pounder anti-tank gun (two)
QF 25-pounder gun-howitzer & Limber
QF 3.7-inch anti-aircraft gun
QF 4.5-inch howitzer
40 mm Bofors L70 (two)
5.5-inch howitzer
57 mm AZP S-60 Anti-aircraft
QF 6-pounder Anti-tank
7 Pdr Mark IV Armstrong Cannon
88 mm Flak 37
FH70 155 Field Howitzer
Flak 20 RH 202 (Rheinmetall)
M1 155 mm Howitzer
M56 105 mm Pack Howitzer
Single 14.5 mm ZPU1
Twin 14.5 mm ZPU2 (two)
Quad 14.5 mm ZPU4 
106 Recoilless Rifle

Support Vehicles

10 KVA Generator
Orme-Evans No1 Mk1 Airborne Trailer
Albion 10TonGS Workshop
Austin 8 Staff Car
Austin K5 GSA
Austin K6 Breakdown Gantry 
Bedford QL 3 Ton
Bedford Radio Van
Brockhouse 20 ton Trailer
Cranes 7.5 ton Trailer
M416 jeep trailer
M19 Gama Goat (three) 
M43 Dodge Ambulance
Austin 12 Saloon Car
Austin K2/Y Ambulance
DKW Munga
90 cm Searchlight
BSA M20 Motor Cycle
Cable Trailer
Chevrolet C8AT Portee
Diamond T 981 Prime Mover
Diamond T 967 Wrecker
Ford GPA (Amphibian)
Ford WOT 2
Ford WOT 6
M9 Rogers 45 Ton Trailer
GMC CCKW 352 (Jimmy)
Godiva Coventry Climax mobile Fire Pump 
Godiva Coventry Climax Fire Pump
Leyland DAF GS
Leyland Hippo Mk II
Morris Commercial C8 FAT Mk3 (Quad)
Praga 8 ton Mobile Crane
SV/25 Scammell Pioneer 
Willys GPW jeep
Russian ZIL-131 Water Tanker
Fire Hose Reel Tender (two)

Missiles

9K11 Malyutka (AT-3 SAGGER)
9M113 Konkurs Wire-guided AT
9M37M Strela 10 SAM
Bristol Bloodhound Mk2
English Electric Thunderbird Mk2
Replica Fieseler Fi 103 (V1 Doodlebug) with a section of the original Peenemünde launch ramp 
9K35 Strela-10 SAM (SA-13 "Gopher") 
Javelin LML trainer
Rapier Mk2 Launcher (& 15 test Missiles)

Radar

Anti Aircraft Fire Control No3 MkVII
Cymbeline mortar locating radar
Green Archer mortar locating radar
Local warning Anti aircraft No4 Mk7
No11 Target Surveillance (Big Ears)
No12 Height Finder (Noddy) 
Type 65 (two)
Type 85
Type 88 Target Surveillance

Gallery

See also
Michael Savory
RAF Weybourne

References

External links

Museum Website

Military aviation museums in England
Military history of Norfolk
Military and war museums in England
Museums in Norfolk
North Norfolk
Tank museums